Okovi is the fifth studio album by American singer-songwriter Zola Jesus. It was released on September 8, 2017 by Sacred Bones Records. The album was written in Danilova's hometown in Wisconsin, where she retreated after dealing with depression and dark times experienced by her close friends.

Critical reception

At Metacritic, which assigns a normalized rating out of 100 to reviews from mainstream publications, the album received an average score of 79, based on 25 reviews, indicating "generally favorable reviews". Emma Madden of Clash praised the album, saying "the production is absolutely masterful. The conviction is assured; the weightiest of subjects: that of 'life' and 'death' are tackled and shackled by Zola expertly." Pitchforks Sasha Geffen said "Okovi showcases the searing, fully-formed music of Nika Danilova, an album of close personal experiences rendered into urgent goth-pop songs as emotional as they are necessary." AllMusic critic Heather Phares called it "a deeply comforting album," further stating: "Okovi is some of Zola Jesus' purest-sounding, most profound music in years." Emily Mackay of The Observer called it "an album to light the way through the darkest hours."

Writing for Drowned in Sound, Pieter J Macmillan said "Okovi won't topple Stridulum II as the most essential Zola Jesus record, but it's another excellent record that once again showcases a unique and powerful voice." Under the Radars Billy Hamilton described the album as "a deeply emotive and enthralling journey." Lisa Wright of DIY wrote: "Heavy with feeling throughout, it makes for a record that's often a tough listen. But for cathartically allowing herself to tackle life's most difficult subjects, you've got to applaud her." Sam Shepherd of MusicOMH stated that "sometimes it sounds bleak, sometimes it sounds glorious, but it's in embracing the full gamut of life experience, as Zola Jesus does here that nothing becomes everything. The shackles might still be on, but this is the sound of an artist reveling in freedom."

Accolades

Track listing

Personnel
Credits adapted from the liner notes of Okovi.

 Zola Jesus – vocals, co-production
 Alex DeGroot – co-production, mixing
 James Kelly – co-production 
 Ted Byrnes – percussion
 Julia Sonmi Heglund – double bass
 Shannon Kennedy – cello, electronics
 Lauren Elizabeth Baba – viola
 Leah Zegar – violin
 Rachel Grace – violin
 Heba Kadry – mastering
 Jesse Draxler – artwork

Charts

References

2017 albums
Sacred Bones Records albums
Zola Jesus albums